Openverse, formerly CC Search, is an open-source search engine for open content developed as part of the WordPress project. It searches Creative Commons licensed and public domain content from dozens of different sources. The software is licensed under the MIT License.

Openverse indexes over 600 million items.

History 
In February 2017 Creative Commons announced CC Search, an open source search engine for open content, and released a beta version. A stable version of CC Search appeared in April 2019.

In December 2020, after Creative Commons staff changes, CC Search and a few other projects no longer had the necessary staff capacity. CC Search and a few other projects went into maintenance mode, i.e. the services remained available but development was suspended.

In April–May 2021, Catherine Stihler (Creative Commons) and Matt Mullenweg (WordPress Foundation, Automattic Inc.) announced that CC Search joined the WordPress project. Automattic hired key members of the CC Search team and sponsors their contributions to the project as part of the Five for the Future initiative. A new name was also introduced, Openverse. Openverse is the successor to CC Search, developed of its code base. It aims to be a broader open content search engine, continue development work and expand features. The WordPress Foundation owns the Openverse trademark and its other intellectual property rights. In December of 2020, the CC Search domain name was redirected to Openverse.

In January 2022, Openverse launched a redesigned user interface and support for searching audio files.

In February 2023, Openverse moved to the domain https://openverse.org and refreshed the user interface: adding a search history for recent searches.

Search engine sources 
Openverse searches content from over 45 different media sources, including Wikimedia Commons, Europeana, and Flickr.

See also 
 Open content

References 
 Episode 8: The Commons of Images – WP Briefing, podcast episode of Openverse

External links 

 
 Openverse developer site
 Openverse developer handbook
 Openverse API
 Openverse Git repositories

Internet search engines
Open content